Tomíček (f. Tomíčková), Tomicek, are Czech family name, and may refer to:

 Jan Slavomír Tomíček (1806, Branná u Jilemnice  1866, Prague)
  (1891  1953), Czech analytical chemist
  (born 1957, Kempten/Allgäu), German cartoonist, works and lives in the Westphalian Werl
 Luboš Tomíček, Jr. (born 1986, Prague)

See also 
 Luboš Tomíček (disambiguation)
 Tomczak
 Tomášek
 Tomčík
 Tomčić

Czech-language surnames